HP CAS may refer to:

Erable, a computer algebra system integrated into the HP 40/49/50 series of Hewlett-Packard scientific calculators
Xcas/Giac, a computer algebra system integrated into the HP Prime scientific calculator